All Kinds of Trouble is the only studio album by British group VS. It was released on 18 October 2004, a week after the release of the album's third single, "Make It Hot". Despite having three successful singles, the album was a commercial failure, peaking at number 142 in its first week, then falling out of the charts. The album's planned fourth single, "If You Leave Me Now", was only released promotionally, as prior to its release, the band disbanded.

Track listing

Notes
"Call U Sexy" contains elements of "Body Talk" (1981) by Imagination.
"If You Leave Me Now" contains elements of "If You Leave Me Now" (1976) by Chicago.
 signifies a vocal producer
 signifies a co-producer

Charts

References

2004 debut albums
Albums produced by Stargate